Tung Ying Building was a 17-storey office building and shopping centre at 100 Nathan Road, at the corner of Granville Road in Tsim Sha Tsui, Kowloon, Hong Kong.

It was built in the 1960s and its style of architecture had become rare in Hong Kong. It was named after the given name of Sir Robert Hotung and his wife. A statue of Sir Robert was located at the ground floor of the building.

It was once the will of the Hotung family not to sell the building. But after his grandson died the family sold it, and the new owner has decided to redevelop.

Chinese Estates Holdings has announced plans to spend up to $1 billion demolishing the 39-year-old Tung Ying Building and turning it into a commercial complex. Demolition work on the Tung Ying Building started in early 2006 and the redevelopment of the site as The ONE shopping centre was completed in 2009/2010.

References

External links

 Information about the building at HK-place.com
  Profile of the building on Ming Pao

Tsim Sha Tsui
Office buildings in Hong Kong
Defunct shopping malls
Former skyscrapers
Shopping centres in Hong Kong
Demolished buildings and structures in Hong Kong
Buildings and structures demolished in 2006